The Asia-Pacific Network for Global Change Research  (APN) is an intergovernmental network that promotes policy-oriented research and capacity-building activities related to global change in the region. APN receives financial contribution from the governments of the United States, Japan, Republic of Korea and New Zealand, with in-kind contribution from all it 22 member countries. The APN Secretariat is based in Kobe, Japan, hosted by the Hyogo Prefectural Government.

History 
The history of APN dates back to the 1990 White House Conference on Science and Economics Research Related to Global Change, 17–18 April 1990, at which then US President George Bush invited countries of the world to join the United States in creating regional networks for North-South scientific cooperation at the intergovernmental level to deal with global environmental change research. Later in 1992, President Bush and then Prime Minister of Japan Kiichi Miyazawa signed the 1992 US-Japan Global Partnership Agreement, which, among other things, reaffirmed and strengthened Japan-US commitment to global change research.

Discussions along these lines ultimately resulted in the establishment of three global change research networks: ENRICH for Europe and Africa, APN for Asia and the Pacific, and IAI for the Americas.

APN was formally launched in 1996 at its first intergovernmental meeting held at Chiang Mai, Thailand. In 1997, a competitive process was in place, open to funding applications for scientific research projects relating to global environmental change.

Membership 
Starting from 12 countries in 1996, APN membership has grown to 22 as of April 2013. In addition to the 22 full members, institutions and individuals from a number of “approved countries” are eligible for APN funding.

APN member countries

APN approved countries 
 Maldives
 Myanmar
 Singapore
 Pacific Island Countries

References

External links 
 Asia-Pacific Network for Global Change Research

Asia-Pacific
Research organizations
Policy
International climate change organizations
Environmental organizations based in Asia